Caelostomus novaebritanniae is a species of ground beetle in the subfamily Pterostichinae. It was described by Fairmaire in 1883.

References

Caelostomus
Beetles described in 1883